John Ainscough was an English professional footballer. A centre-half, he played in the Football League for Blackpool. He played seven League games for the club between 1950 and 1954. He moved to near neighbours Fleetwood Town in 1954, playing a then record 421 games for the club before retiring in 1966.

References

Year of birth missing
English footballers
Blackpool F.C. players
Fleetwood Town F.C. players
Association football defenders